George Benjamin Mohart (March 6, 1892 – October 2, 1970) was a pitcher in Major League Baseball. He pitched in fifteen games for the  Brooklyn Robins during the 1920–1921 baseball seasons.

External links

1892 births
1970 deaths
Baseball players from Buffalo, New York
Major League Baseball pitchers
Brooklyn Robins players
Medicine Hat Hatters players
Greensboro Patriots players
Petersburg Goobers players
Buffalo Bisons (minor league) players
Newark Bears (IL) players
People from Silver Creek, New York